The Equal Rights Amendment (ERA) is a proposed amendment to the United States Constitution designed to guarantee equal legal rights for all American citizens regardless of sex. Proponents assert it would end legal distinctions between men and women in matters of divorce, property, employment, and other matters. The first version of an ERA was written by Alice Paul and Crystal Eastman and introduced in Congress in December 1923.

In the early history of the Equal Rights Amendment, middle-class women were largely supportive, while those speaking for the working class were often opposed, pointing out that employed women needed special protections regarding working conditions and employment hours. With the rise of the women's movement in the United States during the 1960s, the ERA garnered increasing support, and, after being reintroduced by Representative Martha Griffiths in 1971, it was approved by the U.S. House of Representatives on October 12, 1971, and by the U.S. Senate on March 22, 1972, thus submitting the ERA to the state legislatures for ratification, as provided by Article V of the U.S. Constitution.

Congress had originally set a ratification deadline of March 22, 1979, for the state legislatures to consider the ERA. Through 1977, the amendment received 35 of the necessary 38 state ratifications. With wide, bipartisan support (including that of both major political parties, both houses of Congress, and presidents Richard Nixon, Gerald Ford, and Jimmy Carter) the ERA seemed destined for ratification until Phyllis Schlafly mobilized conservative women in opposition. These women argued that the ERA would disadvantage housewives, cause women to be drafted into the military and to lose protections such as alimony, and eliminate the tendency for mothers to obtain custody over their children in divorce cases. Many labor feminists also opposed the ERA on the basis that it would eliminate protections for women in labor law, though over time more and more unions and labor feminist leaders turned toward supporting it.

Five state legislatures (Idaho, Kentucky, Nebraska, Tennessee, and South Dakota) voted to revoke their ERA ratifications. The first four rescinded before the original March 22, 1979 ratification deadline, while the South Dakota legislature did so by voting to sunset its ratification as of that original deadline. It remains an unresolved legal question as to whether a state can revoke its ratification of a federal constitutional amendment.

In 1978, Congress passed (by simple majorities in each house), and President Carter signed, a joint resolution with the intent of extending the ratification deadline to June 30, 1982. Because no additional state legislatures ratified the ERA between March 22, 1979, and June 30, 1982, the validity of that disputed extension was rendered academic. Since 1978, attempts have been made in Congress to extend or remove the deadline.

In the 2010s, due in part to fourth-wave feminism and the Me Too movement, there was a renewed interest in adoption of the ERA. In 2017, Nevada became the first state to ratify the ERA after the expiration of both deadlines, and Illinois followed in 2018. In 2020, Virginia's General Assembly passed a ratification resolution for the ERA, claiming to bring the number of ratifications to 38. However, experts and advocates have acknowledged legal uncertainty about the consequences of the Virginian ratification, due to expired deadlines and five states' revocations.

Resolution text 
The resolution, "Proposing an amendment to the Constitution of the United States relative to equal rights for men and women", reads, in part:

Background 

On September 25, 1921, the National Woman's Party announced its plans to campaign for an amendment to the U.S. Constitution to guarantee women equal rights with men. The text of the proposed amendment read:

Alice Paul, the head of the National Women's Party, believed that the Nineteenth Amendment would not be enough to ensure that men and women were treated equally regardless of sex. In 1923, at Seneca Falls, New York, she revised the proposed amendment to read:

Paul named this version the Lucretia Mott Amendment, after a female abolitionist who fought for women's rights and attended the First Women's Rights Convention. The proposal was seconded by Dr. Frances Dickinson, a cousin of Susan B. Anthony.

In 1943, Alice Paul further revised the amendment to reflect the wording of the Fifteenth and Nineteenth Amendments. This text became Section 1 of the version passed by Congress in 1972.

As a result, in the 1940s, ERA opponents proposed an alternative, which provided that "no distinctions on the basis of sex shall be made except such as are reasonably justified by differences in physical structure, biological differences, or social function." It was quickly rejected by both pro and anti-ERA coalitions.

Feminists split 
Since the 1920s, the Equal Rights Amendment has been accompanied by discussion among feminists about the meaning of women's equality. Alice Paul and her National Woman's Party asserted that women should be on equal terms with men in all regards, even if that means sacrificing benefits given to women through protective legislation, such as shorter work hours and no night work or heavy lifting. Opponents of the amendment, such as the Women's Joint Congressional Committee, believed that the loss of these benefits to women would not be worth the supposed gain to them in equality. In 1924, The Forum hosted a debate between Doris Stevens and Alice Hamilton concerning the two perspectives on the proposed amendment. Their debate reflected the wider tension in the developing feminist movement of the early 20th century between two approaches toward gender equality. One approach emphasized the common humanity of women and men, while the other stressed women's unique experiences and how they were different from men, seeking recognition for specific needs. The opposition to the ERA was led by Mary Anderson and the Women's Bureau beginning in 1923. These feminists argued that legislation including mandated minimum wages, safety regulations, restricted daily and weekly hours, lunch breaks, and maternity provisions would be more beneficial to the majority of women who were forced to work out of economic necessity, not personal fulfillment. The debate also drew from struggles between working class and professional women. Alice Hamilton, in her speech "Protection for Women Workers", said that the ERA would strip working women of the small protections they had achieved, leaving them powerless to further improve their condition in the future, or to attain necessary protections in the present.

The National Woman's Party already had tested its approach in Wisconsin, where it won passage of the Wisconsin Equal Rights Law in 1921. The party then took the ERA to Congress, where U.S. senator Charles Curtis, a future vice president of the United States, introduced it for the first time in October 1921. Although the ERA was introduced in every congressional session between 1921 and 1972, it almost never reached the floor of either the Senate or the House for a vote. Instead, it was usually blocked in committee; except in 1946, when it was defeated in the Senate by a vote of 38 to 35—not receiving the required two-thirds supermajority.

Hayden rider and protective labor legislation 
In 1950 and 1953, the ERA was passed by the Senate with a provision known as "the Hayden rider", introduced by Arizona senator Carl Hayden. The Hayden rider added a sentence to the ERA to keep special protections for women: "The provisions of this article shall not be construed to impair any rights, benefits, or exemptions now or hereafter conferred by law upon persons of the female sex." By allowing women to keep their existing and future special protections, it was expected that the ERA would be more appealing to its opponents. Though opponents were marginally more in favor of the ERA with the Hayden rider, supporters of the original ERA believed it negated the amendment's original purpose—causing the amendment not to be passed in the House.

ERA supporters were hopeful that the second term of President Dwight Eisenhower would advance their agenda. Eisenhower had publicly promised to "assure women everywhere in our land equality of rights," and in 1958, Eisenhower asked a joint session of Congress to pass the Equal Rights Amendment, the first president to show such a level of support for the amendment. However, the National Woman's Party found the amendment to be unacceptable and asked it to be withdrawn whenever the Hayden rider was added to the ERA.

The Republican Party included support of the ERA in its platform beginning in 1940, renewing the plank every four years until 1980. The ERA was strongly opposed by the American Federation of Labor and other labor unions, which feared the amendment would invalidate protective labor legislation for women. Eleanor Roosevelt and most New Dealers also opposed the ERA. They felt that ERA was designed for middle-class women, but that working-class women needed government protection. They also feared that the ERA would undercut the male-dominated labor unions that were a core component of the New Deal coalition. Most Northern Democrats, who aligned themselves with the anti-ERA labor unions, opposed the amendment. The ERA was supported by Southern Democrats and almost all Republicans.

At the 1944 Democratic National Convention, the Democrats made the divisive step of including the ERA in their platform, but the Democratic Party did not become united in favor of the amendment until congressional passage in 1972. The main support base for the ERA until the late 1960s was among middle class Republican women. The League of Women Voters, formerly the National American Woman Suffrage Association, opposed the Equal Rights Amendment until 1972, fearing the loss of protective labor legislation.

1960s 
At the Democratic National Convention in 1960, a proposal to endorse the ERA was rejected after it was opposed by groups including the American Civil Liberties Union (ACLU), the AFL–CIO, labor unions such as the American Federation of Teachers, Americans for Democratic Action (ADA), the American Nurses Association, the Women's Division of the Methodist Church, and the National Councils of Jewish, Catholic, and Negro Women. Presidential candidate John F. Kennedy announced his support of the ERA in an October 21, 1960, letter to the chairman of the National Woman's Party. When Kennedy was elected, he made Esther Peterson the highest-ranking woman in his administration as an assistant secretary of labor. Peterson publicly opposed the Equal Rights Amendment based on her belief that it would weaken protective labor legislation. Peterson referred to the National Woman's Party members, most of them veteran suffragists and preferred the "specific bills for specific ills" approach to equal rights. Ultimately, Kennedy's ties to labor unions meant that he and his administration did not support the ERA.

President Kennedy appointed a blue-ribbon commission on women, the President's Commission on the Status of Women, to investigate the problem of sex discrimination in the United States. The commission was chaired by Eleanor Roosevelt, who opposed the ERA but no longer spoke against it publicly. In the early 1960s, Eleanor Roosevelt announced that, due to unionization, she believed the ERA was no longer a threat to women as it once may have been and told supporters that, as far as she was concerned, they could have the amendment if they wanted it. However, she never went so far as to endorse the ERA. The commission that she chaired reported (after her death) that no ERA was needed, believing that the Supreme Court could give sex the same "suspect" test as race and national origin, through interpretation of the Fifth and Fourteenth Amendments of the Constitution. The Supreme Court did not provide the "suspect" class test for sex, however, resulting in a continuing lack of equal rights. The commission did, though, help win passage of the Equal Pay Act of 1963, which banned sex discrimination in wages in a number of professions (it would later be amended in the early 1970s to include the professions that it initially excluded) and secured an executive order from Kennedy eliminating sex discrimination in the civil service. The commission, composed largely of anti-ERA feminists with ties to labor, proposed remedies to the widespread sex discrimination it unearthed.

The national commission spurred the establishment of state and local commissions on the status of women and arranged for follow-up conferences in the years to come. The following year, the Civil Rights Act of 1964 banned workplace discrimination not only on the basis of race, religion, and national origin, but also on the basis of sex, thanks to the lobbying of Alice Paul and Coretta Scott King and the political influence of Representative Martha Griffiths of Michigan.

A new women's movement gained ground in the later 1960s as a result of a variety of factors: Betty Friedan's bestseller The Feminine Mystique; the network of women's rights commissions formed by Kennedy's national commission; the frustration over women's social and economic status; and anger over the lack of government and Equal Employment Opportunity Commission enforcement of the Equal Pay Act and Title VII of the Civil Rights Act. In June 1966, at the Third National Conference on the Status of Women in Washington, D.C., Betty Friedan and a group of activists frustrated with the lack of government action in enforcing Title VII of the Civil Rights Act formed the National Organization for Women (NOW) to act as an "NAACP for women", demanding full equality for American women and men. In 1967, at the urging of Alice Paul, NOW endorsed the Equal Rights Amendment. The decision caused some union Democrats and social conservatives to leave the organization and form the Women's Equity Action League (within a few years WEAL also endorsed the ERA), but the move to support the amendment benefited NOW, bolstering its membership. By the late 1960s, NOW had made significant political and legislative victories and was gaining enough power to become a major lobbying force. In 1969, newly elected representative Shirley Chisholm of New York gave her famous speech "Equal Rights for Women" on the floor of the U.S. House of Representatives.

Congressional passage 

In February 1970, NOW picketed the United States Senate, a subcommittee of which was holding hearings on a constitutional amendment to lower the voting age to 18. NOW disrupted the hearings and demanded a hearing on the Equal Rights Amendment and won a meeting with senators to discuss the ERA. That August, over 20,000 American women held a nationwide Women's Strike for Equality protest to demand full social, economic, and political equality. Said Betty Friedan of the strike, "All kinds of women's groups all over the country will be using this week on August 26 particularly, to point out those areas in women's life which are still not addressed. For example, a question of equality before the law; we are interested in the Equal Rights Amendment." Despite being centered in New York City—which was regarded as one of the biggest strongholds for NOW and other groups sympathetic to the women's liberation movement such as Redstockings—and having a small number of participants in contrast to the large-scale anti-war and civil rights protests that had occurred in the recent time prior to the event, the strike was credited as one of the biggest turning points in the rise of second-wave feminism.

In Washington, D.C., protesters presented a sympathetic Senate leadership with a petition for the Equal Rights Amendment at the U.S. Capitol. Influential news sources such as Time also supported the cause of the protestors. Soon after the strike took place, activists distributed literature across the country as well. In 1970, congressional hearings began on the ERA.

On August 10, 1970, Michigan Democrat Martha Griffiths successfully brought the Equal Rights Amendment to the House floor, after 15 years of the joint resolution having languished in the House Judiciary Committee. The joint resolution passed in the House and continued on to the Senate, which voted for the ERA with an added clause that women would be exempt from the military. The 91st Congress, however, ended before the joint resolution could progress any further.

Griffiths reintroduced the ERA, and achieved success on Capitol Hill with her , which was adopted by the House on October 12, 1971, with a vote of 354 yeas (For), 24 nays (Against) and 51 not voting. Griffiths's joint resolution was then adopted by the Senate—without change—on March 22, 1972, by a vote of 84 yeas, 8 nays and 7 not voting. The Senate version, drafted by Senator Birch Bayh of Indiana, passed after the defeat of an amendment proposed by Senator Sam Ervin of North Carolina that would have exempted women from the draft. President Richard Nixon immediately endorsed the ERA's approval upon its passage by the 92nd Congress.

Actions in the state legislatures

Ratifications 
On March 22, 1972, the ERA was placed before the state legislatures, with a seven-year deadline to acquire ratification by three-fourths (38) of the state legislatures. A majority of states ratified the proposed constitutional amendment within a year. Hawaii became the first state to ratify the ERA, which it did on the same day the amendment was approved by Congress: The U.S. Senate's vote on  took place in the mid-to-late afternoon in Washington, D.C., when it was still midday in Hawaii. The Hawaii Senate and House of Representatives voted their approval shortly after noon Hawaii Standard Time.

During 1972, a total of 22 state legislatures ratified the amendment and eight more joined in early 1973. Between 1974 and 1977, only five states approved the ERA, and advocates became worried about the approaching March 22, 1979, deadline. At the same time, the legislatures of five states that had ratified the ERA then adopted legislation purporting to rescind those ratifications. If, indeed, a state legislature has the ability to rescind, then the ERA actually had ratifications by only 30 states—not 35—when March 22, 1979, arrived.

The ERA has been ratified by the following states:

* = Ratification revoked (see below)

** = Ratification revoked after June 30, 1982

 Hawaii (March 22, 1972)
 New Hampshire (March 23, 1972)
 Delaware (March 23, 1972)
 Iowa (March 24, 1972)
 Idaho (March 24, 1972) *
 Kansas (March 28, 1972)
 Nebraska (March 29, 1972) *
 Texas (March 30, 1972)
 Tennessee (April 4, 1972) *
 Alaska (April 5, 1972)
 Rhode Island (April 14, 1972)
 New Jersey (April 17, 1972)
 Colorado (April 21, 1972)
 West Virginia (April 22, 1972)
 Wisconsin (April 26, 1972)
 New York (May 18, 1972)
 Michigan (May 22, 1972)
 Maryland (May 26, 1972)
 Massachusetts (June 21, 1972)
 Kentucky (June 27, 1972) *
 Pennsylvania (September 27, 1972)
 California (November 13, 1972)
 Wyoming (January 26, 1973)
 South Dakota (February 5, 1973) *
 Oregon (February 8, 1973)
 Minnesota (February 8, 1973)
 New Mexico (February 28, 1973)
 Vermont (March 1, 1973)
 Connecticut (March 15, 1973)
 Washington (March 22, 1973)
 Maine (January 18, 1974)
 Montana (January 25, 1974)
 Ohio (February 7, 1974)
 North Dakota (February 3, 1975) **
 Indiana (January 18, 1977)
 Nevada (March 22, 2017)
 Illinois (May 30, 2018)
 Virginia (January 27, 2020)

Ratifications revoked 
Although Article V is silent as to whether a state may rescind, or otherwise revoke, a previous ratification of a proposed—but not yet adopted—amendment to the U.S. Constitution, legislators in the following six states nevertheless voted to retract their earlier ratification of the ERA:

 Nebraska (March 15, 1973: Legislative Resolution No. 9)
 Tennessee (April 23, 1974: Senate Joint Resolution No. 29)
 Idaho (February 8, 1977: House Concurrent Resolution No. 10)
 Kentucky (March 17, 1978: House [Joint] Resolution No. 20)
 South Dakota (March 5, 1979: Senate Joint Resolution No. 2)
 North Dakota (March 19, 2021: Senate Concurrent Resolution No. 4010)

The lieutenant governor of Kentucky, Thelma Stovall, who was acting as governor in the governor's absence, vetoed the rescinding resolution. Given that Article V explicitly provides that amendments are valid "when ratified by the legislatures of three fourths of the several states" this raised questions as to whether a state's governor, or someone temporarily acting as governor, has the power to veto any measure related to amending the United States Constitution.

During the 65th Session of the Texas Legislature held January to June of 1977, bills were introduced in the House and Senate to recall Texas's ratification of the national Equal Rights Amendment. Recall differs from rescission in that rescinding annuls an action whereas recalling retracts or revokes the previous action. To fight this recall effort, Texans for the ERA was formed and hired a full-time lobbyist, Norma Cude, to prevent the passage of the recall legislation.  The Texas House of Representatives held a hearing on the bill that was attended by hundreds of supporters for and against the recall measure.  The recall bill died in committee and was not introduced in the next legislative session 2 years later.

On February 11, 2022, the West Virginia Senate passed a resolution rescinding West Virginia's ratification of the ERA, but this resolution died in committee upon conclusion of the 85th legislature.

Sunsetting ratifications

South Dakota (pre-1979 deadline) 
Among those rejecting Congress's claim to even hold authority to extend a previously established ratification deadline, the South Dakota Legislature adopted Senate Joint Resolution No. 2 on March 1, 1979. The joint resolution stipulated that South Dakota's 1973 ERA ratification would be "sunsetted" as of the original deadline, March 22, 1979. South Dakota's 1979 sunset joint resolution declared: "the Ninety-fifth Congress ex post facto has sought unilaterally to alter the terms and conditions in such a way as to materially affect the congressionally established time period for ratification" (designated as "POM-93" by the U.S. Senate and published verbatim in the Congressional Record of March 13, 1979, at pages 4861 and 4862).

The action on the part of South Dakota lawmakers—occurring 21 days prior to originally agreed-upon deadline of March 22, 1979—could be viewed as slightly different from a rescission. Constitution Annotated notes that "[f]our states had rescinded their ratifications [of the ERA] and a fifth had declared that its ratification would be void unless the amendment was ratified within the original time limit", with a footnote identifying South Dakota as that "fifth" state.

North Dakota (post-1979 deadline) 
On March 19, 2021, North Dakota state lawmakers adopted Senate Concurrent Resolution No. 4010 to retroactively clarify that North Dakota's 1975 ratification of the ERA was valid only through "...11:59 p.m. on March 22, 1979..." and went on to proclaim that North Dakota "...should not be counted by Congress, the Archivist of the United States, lawmakers in any other state, any court of law, or any other person, as still having on record a live ratification of the proposed Equal Rights Amendment to the Constitution of the United States as was offered by House Joint Resolution No. 208 of the 92nd Congress on March 22, 1972...." The resolution was formally received by the U.S. Senate on April 20, 2021, was designated as "POM-10", was referred to the Senate's Judiciary Committee, and its full and complete verbatim text was published at page S2066 of the Congressional Record.

Minnesota (2021 proposal) 
A resolution was introduced in the Minnesota Senate on January 11, 2021, which—if adopted—would retroactively clarify that Minnesota's 1973 ratification of the ERA expired as of the originally-designated March 22, 1979, deadline.

Non-ratifying states with one-house approval 
At various times, in six of the 12 non-ratifying states, one house of the legislature approved the ERA. It failed in those states because both houses of a state's legislature must approve, during the same session, in order for that state to be deemed to have ratified.

 South Carolina: State House of Representatives voted to ratify the ERA on March 22, 1972, with a tally of 83 to zero. Representative Carolyn Frederick introduced H.3092, the South Carolina Equal Rights Amendment (ERA), as a Joint Resolution into the SC House of Representatives. On that day it passed the first and second readings, 83-0, and was ordered to a third reading. The third reading was held and passed on March 30, 1972, and the Joint Resolution was forwarded to the Senate. Although the Senate did not pass the Joint Resolution, South Carolina did consider ratification of the ERA on March 22, 1972 — the same day Congress sent the amendment to the states.
 Oklahoma: State Senate voted to ratify the ERA on March 23, 1972, by a voice vote.
 Florida: State House of Representatives voted to ratify the ERA on March 24, 1972, with a tally of 91 to 4; a second time on April 10, 1975, with a tally of 62 to 58; a third time on May 17, 1979, with a tally of 66 to 53; and a fourth time on June 21, 1982, with a tally of 60 to 58.
 Louisiana: State Senate voted to ratify the ERA on June 7, 1972, with a tally of 25 to 13.
 Missouri: State House of Representatives voted to ratify the ERA on February 7, 1975, with a tally of 82 to 75.
 North Carolina: State House of Representatives voted to ratify the ERA on February 9, 1977, with a tally of 61 to 55.

Ratification resolutions have also been defeated in Arizona, Arkansas, and Mississippi.

Congressional extension of ratification deadline 

The original joint resolution, by which the 92nd Congress proposed the amendment to the states, was prefaced by the following resolving clause:

As the joint resolution was passed on March 22, 1972, this effectively set March 22, 1979 as the deadline for the amendment to be ratified by the requisite number of states. However, the 92nd Congress did not incorporate any time limit into the body of the actual text of the proposed amendment, as had been done with a number of other proposed amendments.

In 1978, as the original 1979 deadline approached, the 95th Congress adopted , by Representative Elizabeth Holtzman of New York (House: August; Senate: October 6; signing of the President: October 20), which purported to extend the ERA's ratification deadline to June 30, 1982. H.J.Res. 638 received less than two-thirds of the vote (a simple majority, not a supermajority) in both the House of Representatives and the Senate; for that reason, ERA supporters deemed it necessary that H.J.Res. 638 be transmitted to then-President Jimmy Carter for signature as a safety precaution. The U.S. Supreme Court ruled in Hollingsworth v. Virginia (1798) that the President of the United States has no formal role in the passing of constitutional amendments. Carter signed the joint resolution, although he noted, on strictly procedural grounds, the irregularity of his doing so given the Supreme Court's decision in 1798. During this disputed extension of slightly more than three years, no additional states ratified or rescinded.

The purported extension of ERA's ratification deadline was vigorously contested in 1978 as scholars were divided as to whether Congress actually has authority to revise a previously agreed-to deadline for the states to act upon a constitutional amendment. On June 18, 1980, a resolution in the Illinois House of Representatives resulted in a vote of 102–71 in favor, but Illinois' internal parliamentary rules required a three-fifths majority on constitutional amendments and so the measure failed by five votes. In 1982, seven female ERA supporters, known as the Grassroots Group of Second Class Citizens, went on a fast and seventeen chained themselves to the entrance of the Illinois Senate chamber. The closest that the ERA came to gaining an additional ratification between the original deadline of March 22, 1979, and the revised June 30, 1982, expiration date was when it was approved by the Florida House of Representatives on June 21, 1982. In the final week before the revised deadline, that ratifying resolution, however, was defeated in the Florida Senate by a vote of 16 to 22. Even if Florida had ratified the ERA, the proposed amendment would still have fallen short of the required 38. Many ERA supporters mourned the failure of the amendment. For example, a jazz funeral for the ERA was held in New Orleans in July 1982.

According to research by Jules B. Gerard, professor of law at Washington University in St. Louis, of the 35 legislatures that passed ratification resolutions, 24 of them explicitly referred to the original 1979 deadline.

Lawsuit regarding deadline extension 
On December 23, 1981, a federal district court, in the case of Idaho v. Freeman, ruled that the extension of the ERA ratification deadline to June 30, 1982 was not valid, and that ERA had actually expired from state legislative consideration more than two years earlier on the original expiration date of March 22, 1979. On January 25, 1982, however, the U.S. Supreme Court stayed the lower court's decision.

After the disputed June 30, 1982, extended deadline had come and gone, the Supreme Court, at the beginning of its new term, on October 4, 1982, in the separate case of NOW v. Idaho, 459 U.S. 809 (1982), vacated the federal district court decision in Idaho v. Freeman, which, in addition to declaring March 22, 1979, as ERA's expiration date, had upheld the validity of state rescissions. The Supreme Court declared these controversies moot based on the memorandum of the appellant Gerald P. Carmen, the then-Administrator of General Services, that the ERA had not received the required number of ratifications (38) and so "the Amendment has failed of adoption no matter what the resolution of the legal issues presented here."

In the 1939 case of Coleman v. Miller, the Supreme Court ruled that Congress has the final authority to determine whether, by lapse of time, a proposed constitutional amendment has lost its vitality before being ratified by enough states, and whether state ratifications are effective in light of attempts at subsequent withdrawal. The Court stated: "We think that, in accordance with this historic precedent, the question of the efficacy of ratifications by state legislatures, in the light of previous rejection or attempted withdrawal, should be regarded as a political question pertaining to the political departments, with the ultimate authority in the Congress in the exercise of its control over the promulgation of the adoption of the amendment."

In the context of this judicial precedent, nonpartisan counsel to a Nevada state legislative committee concluded in 2017 that "If three more states sent their ratification to the appropriate federal official, it would then be up to Congress to determine whether a sufficient number of states have ratified the Equal Rights Amendment." In 2018, Virginia attorney general Mark Herring wrote an opinion suggesting that Congress could extend or remove the ratification deadline.

Lawsuits regarding ratification

Alabama lawsuit to opposing ratification 
On December 16, 2019, the states of Alabama, Louisiana and South Dakota sued to prevent further ratifying of the Equal Rights Amendment. Alabama Attorney General Steve Marshall stated, "The people had seven years to consider the ERA, and they rejected it. To sneak it into the Constitution through this illegal process would undermine the very basis for our constitutional order."

South Dakota Attorney General Jason Ravnsborg stated in a press release:

On January 6, 2020, the Department of Justice Office of Legal Counsel official Steven Engel issued an opinion in response to the lawsuit by Alabama, Louisiana, and South Dakota, stating that "We conclude that Congress had the constitutional authority to impose a deadline on the ratification of the ERA and, because that deadline has expired, the ERA Resolution is no longer pending before the States." The OLC argued in part that Congress had the authority to impose a deadline for the ERA and that it did not have the authority to retroactively extend the deadline once it had expired.

On February 27, 2020, the States of Alabama, Louisiana and South Dakota entered into a joint stipulation and voluntary dismissal with the Archivist of the United States. The joint stipulation incorporated the Department of Justice's Office of Legal Counsel's opinion; stated that the Archivist would not certify the adoption of the Equal Rights Amendment and stated that if the Department of Justice ever concludes that the 1972 ERA Resolution is still pending and that the Archivist therefore has authority to certify the ERA's adoption ... the Archivist will make no certification concerning ratification of the ERA until at least 45 days following the announcement of the Department of Justice's conclusion, absent a court order compelling him to do so sooner." On March 2, 2020, Federal District Court Judge L. Scott Coogler entered an order regarding the Joint Stipulation and Plaintiff's Voluntary Dismissal, granting the dismissal without prejudice.

Massachusetts lawsuit supporting ratification 
On January 7, 2020, a complaint was filed by Equal Means Equal, The Yellow Roses and Katherine Weitbrecht in the United States District Court for the District of Massachusetts against the Archivist of the United States seeking to have him count the three most recently ratifying states and certify the ERA as having become part of the United States Constitution. On August 6, 2020, Judge Denise Casper granted the Archivist's motion to dismiss, ruling that the plaintiffs did not have standing to sue to compel the Archivist to certify and so she could not rule on the merits of the case. On August 21, 2020, the plaintiffs appealed this decision to the United States Court of Appeals for the First Circuit and on September 2, 2020, the plaintiffs asked the Supreme Court to hear this case. Subsequently, the Supreme Court denied the request to intervene before the First Circuit gives its decision.  On June 29, 2021, the First Circuit affirmed the District Court's decision that "the plaintiffs have not met their burden at the pleading stage with respect to those federal constitutional requirements, we affirm the order dismissing their suit for lack of standing." An en banc rehearing request was denied on January 4, 2022.

2020-2023 D.C. Court lawsuit supporting ratification 
On January 30, 2020, the attorneys general of Virginia, Illinois and Nevada filed a lawsuit to require the Archivist of the United States to "carry out his statutory duty of recognizing the complete and final adoption" of the ERA as the Twenty-eighth Amendment to the Constitution.
On February 19, 2020, the States of Alabama, Louisiana, Nebraska, South Dakota and Tennessee moved to intervene in the case. On March 10, 2020, the Plaintiff States (Virginia, Illinois and Nevada) filed a memorandum in opposition to the five states seeking to intervene. On May 7, 2020, the DOJ filed a motion to dismiss, claiming the states do not have standing to bring the case to trial as they have to show any "concrete injury", nor that the case was ripe for review.

On June 12, 2020, the District Court granted the Intervening states (Alabama, Louisiana, Nebraska, South Dakota and Tennessee) motion to intervene in the case. On March 5, 2021, federal judge Rudolph Contreras of the United States District Court for the District of Columbia ruled that the ratification period for the ERA "expired long ago" and that three states' recent ratifications had come too late to be counted in the amendment's favor.

On May 3, 2021, the plaintiff states appealed the ruling to the United States Court of Appeals for the District of Columbia Circuit. Virginia withdrew from the lawsuit in February 2022. Oral arguments were held on September 28, 2022, before a panel composed by judges Wilkins, Rao and Childs. On February 28, 2023, the panel ruled that the plaintiffs failed the prove the ERA deadline invalid.

Support 
Supporters of the ERA point to the lack of a specific guarantee in the Constitution for equal rights protections on the basis of sex. In 1973, future Supreme Court justice Ruth Bader Ginsburg summarized a supporting argument for the ERA in the American Bar Association Journal:The equal rights amendment, in sum, would dedicate the nation to a new view of the rights and responsibilities of men and women. It firmly rejects sharp legislative lines between the sexes as constitutionally tolerable. Instead, it looks toward a legal system in which each person will be judged on the basis of individual merit and not on the basis of an unalterable trait of birth that bears no necessary relationship to need or ability.

Later, Ginsburg voiced her opinion that the best course of action on the Equal Rights Amendment is to start over, due to being past its expiration date. While at a discussion at Georgetown University in February 2020, Ginsburg noted the challenge that "if you count a latecomer on the plus side, how can you disregard states that said 'we've changed our minds?'"

In the early 1940s, both the Democratic and Republican parties added support for the ERA to their platforms.

The National Organization for Women (NOW) and ERAmerica, a coalition of almost 80 organizations, led the pro-ERA efforts. Between 1972 and 1982, ERA supporters held rallies, petitioned, picketed, went on hunger strikes, and performed acts of civil disobedience. On July 9, 1978, NOW and other organizations hosted a national march in Washington, D.C., which garnered over 100,000 supporters, and was followed by a Lobby Day on July 10. On June 6, 1982, NOW sponsored marches in states that had not passed the ERA including Florida, Illinois, North Carolina, and Oklahoma. Key feminists of the time, such as Gloria Steinem, spoke out in favor of the ERA, arguing that ERA opposition was based on gender myths that overemphasized difference and ignored evidence of unequal treatment between men and women. A more militant feminist group, Grassroots Group of Second Class Citizens, organized a series of non-violent direct action tactics in support of the ERA in Illinois in 1982.

Among black Americans 
Many African-American women have supported the ERA. One prominent female supporter was New York representative Shirley Chisholm. On August 10, 1970, she gave a speech on the ERA called "For the Equal Rights Amendment" in Washington, D.C. In her address, she claimed that sex discrimination had become widespread and that the ERA would remedy it. She also claimed that laws to protect women in the workforce from unsafe working conditions would be needed by men, too, and thus the ERA would help all people.

By 1976, 60% of African-American women and 63% of African-American men were in favor of the ERA, and the legislation was supported by organizations such as the NAACP, National Council of Negro Women, Coalition of Black Trade Unionists, National Association of Negro Business, and the National Black Feminist Organization.

Among Republicans 
Many Republican women supported the ERA including Florence Dwyer, Jill Ruckelshaus, Mary Dent Crisp, Justice Sandra Day O'Connor, First Lady Betty Ford and Senator Margaret Chase Smith. Support from Republican men included President Dwight D. Eisenhower, President Richard Nixon, Senator Richard Lugar and Senator Strom Thurmond.

Opposition 

Opponents of the ERA focused on traditional gender roles, such as how men do the fighting in wartime. They argued that the amendment would guarantee the possibility that women would be subject to conscription and be required to have military combat roles in future wars if it were passed. Defense of traditional gender roles proved to be a useful tactic. In Illinois, supporters of Phyllis Schlafly, a conservative Republican activist from that state, used traditional symbols of the American housewife. They took homemade bread, jams, and apple pies to the state legislators, with the slogans, "Preserve us from a Congressional jam; Vote against the ERA sham" and "I am for Mom and apple pie." They appealed to married women by stressing that the amendment would invalidate protective laws such as alimony and eliminate the tendency for mothers to obtain custody over their children in divorce cases. It was suggested that single-sex bathrooms would be eliminated and same-sex couples would be able to get married if the amendment were passed. Women who supported traditional gender roles started to oppose the ERA. Schlafly said passage of the amendment would threaten Social Security benefits for housewives. Opponents also argued that men and women were already equal enough with the passage of the Equal Pay Act of 1963 and the Civil Rights Act of 1964, and that women's colleges would have to admit men. Schlafly's argument that protective laws would be lost resonated with working-class women.

At the 1980 Republican National Convention, the Republican Party platform was amended to end its support for the ERA. The most prominent opponent of the ERA was Schlafly. Leading the Stop ERA campaign, Schlafly defended traditional gender roles and would often attempt to incite feminists by opening her speeches with lines such as, "I'd like to thank my husband for letting me be here tonight—I always like to say that, because it makes the libs so mad." When Schlafly began her campaign in 1972, public polls showed support for the amendment was widely popular and thirty states had ratified the amendment by 1973. After 1973, the number of ratifying states slowed to a trickle. Support in the states that had not ratified fell below 50%. Public opinion in key states shifted against the ERA as its opponents, operating on the local and state levels, won over the public. The state legislators in battleground states followed public opinion in rejecting the ERA.

Phyllis Schlafly was a key player in the defeat. Political scientist Jane Mansbridge in her history of the ERA argues that the draft issue was the single most powerful argument used by Schlafly and the other opponents to defeat ERA. Mansbridge concluded, "Many people who followed the struggle over the ERA believed—rightly in my view—that the Amendment would have been ratified by 1975 or 1976 had it not been for Phyllis Schlafly's early and effective effort to organize potential opponents." Legal scholar Joan C. Williams maintained, "ERA was defeated when Schlafly turned it into a war among women over gender roles." Historian Judith Glazer-Raymo asserted:

As moderates, we thought we represented the forces of reason and goodwill but failed to take seriously the power of the family values argument and the single-mindedness of Schlafly and her followers. The ERA's defeat seriously damaged the women's movement, destroying its momentum and its potential to foment social change... Eventually, this resulted in feminist dissatisfaction with the Republican Party, giving the Democrats a new source of strength that when combined with overwhelming minority support, helped elect Bill Clinton to the presidency in 1992 and again in 1996.

The John Birch Society and its members organized opposition to the ERA in multiple states. According to Professor Edward H. Miller, it played a key role in addition to Schlafly in preventing the amendment’s ratification.

Many ERA supporters blamed their defeat on special interest forces, especially the insurance industry and conservative organizations, suggesting that they had funded an opposition that subverted the democratic process and the will of the pro-ERA majority. Such supporters argued that while the public face of the anti-ERA movement was Phyllis Schlafly and her STOP ERA organization, there were other important groups in the opposition as well, such as the powerful National Council of Catholic Women, labor feminists and (until 1973) the AFL–CIO. Steinem blamed the insurance industry and said Schlafly "did not change one vote." Opposition to the amendment was particularly high among religious conservatives, who argued that the amendment would guarantee universal abortion rights and the right for homosexual couples to marry. Critchlow and Stachecki say the anti-ERA movement was based on strong backing among Southern whites, Evangelical Christians, members of the Church of Jesus Christ of Latter-day Saints, Orthodox Jews, and Roman Catholics, including both men and women.

The ERA has long been opposed by anti-abortion groups who believe it would be interpreted to allow legal abortion without limits and taxpayer funding for abortion.

Post-deadline ratifications and the "three-state strategy" 
Beginning in the mid-1990s, ERA supporters began an effort to win ratification of the ERA by the legislatures of states that did not ratify it between 1972 and 1982. These proponents state that Congress can remove the ERA's ratification deadline despite the deadline having expired, allowing the states again to ratify it. They also state that the ratifications ERA previously received remain in force and that rescissions of prior ratifications are not valid. Those who espouse the "three-state strategy" (now complete if the Nevada, Illinois and Virginia belated ERA approvals are deemed legitimate) were spurred, at least in part, by the unconventional 202-year-long ratification of the Constitution's Twenty-seventh Amendment (sometimes referred to as the "Madison Amendment") which became part of the Constitution in 1992 after pending before the state legislatures since 1789. However, the "Madison Amendment" was not associated with a ratification deadline, whereas the proposing clause of the ERA did include a deadline.

On June 21, 2009, the National Organization for Women decided to support both efforts to obtain additional state ratifications for the 1972 ERA and any strategy to submit a fresh-start ERA to the states for ratification.

In 2013, the Library of Congress's Congressional Research Service issued a report saying that ratification deadlines are a political question: The report goes on to say:

However, most recently, ERA Action has both led and brought renewed vigor to the movement by instituting what has become known as the "three-state strategy". In 2013, ERA Action began to gain traction with this strategy through their coordination with U.S. Senators and Representatives not only to introduce legislation in both houses of Congress to remove the ratification deadline, but also in gaining legislative sponsors. The Congressional Research Service then issued a report on the "three state strategy" on April 8, 2013, entitled "The Proposed Equal Rights Amendment: Contemporary Ratification Issues", stating that the approach was viable.

In 2014, under the auspices of ERA Action and their coalition partners, both the Virginia and Illinois state senates voted to ratify the ERA. That year, votes were blocked in both states' House chambers. In the meantime, the ERA ratification movement continued with the resolution being introduced in 10 state legislatures.

On March 22, 2017, the Nevada Legislature became the first state in 40 years to ratify the ERA.

Illinois lawmakers and citizens took another look at the ERA, with hearings, testimony, and research including work by the law firm Winston & Strawn to address common legal questions about the ERA.

Illinois state lawmakers ratified the ERA on May 30, 2018, with a 72–45 vote in the Illinois House following a 43–12 vote in the Illinois Senate in April 2018.

An effort to ratify the ERA in the Virginia General Assembly in 2018 failed to reach the floor of either the House of Delegates or Senate. In 2019, a Senate committee voted to advance the ERA to the floor. On January 15, the Senate voted 26–14 to approve the amendment and forward it to the House of Delegates, but it was defeated there in a 50–50 tied vote; at the time, the Republican Party held one-seat majorities in both houses. After the 2019 elections in Virginia gave the Democratic Party majority control of both houses of the Virginia legislature, the incoming leaders expressed their intent to hold another vote on ratification early in the 2020 legislative session. Keeping to their word, they did so, with ERA ratification resolutions HJ1 and SJ1 being passed in their respective chambers on January 15, 2020, and being passed by each other on January 27.

Subsequent congressional action 
The amendment has been reintroduced in every session of Congress since 1982. Senator Ted Kennedy (D-Massachusetts) championed it in the Senate from the 99th Congress through the 110th Congress. Senator Robert Menendez (D-New Jersey) introduced the amendment symbolically at the end of the 111th Congress and has supported it in the 112th Congress. In the House of Representatives, Carolyn Maloney (D-New York) has sponsored it since the 105th Congress, most recently in August 2013.

In 1983, the ERA passed through House committees with the same text as in 1972; however, it failed by six votes to achieve the necessary two-thirds vote on the House floor. That was the last time that the ERA received a floor vote in either house of Congress.

At the start of the 112th Congress on January 6, 2011, Senator Menendez, along with representatives Maloney, Jerrold Nadler (D-New York) and Gwen Moore (D-Wisconsin), held a press conference advocating for the Equal Rights Amendment's adoption.

The 113th Congress had a record number of women. On March 5, 2013, the ERA was reintroduced by Senator Menendez as S.J. Res. 10.

The "New ERA" introduced in 2013, sponsored by Representative Carolyn B. Maloney, adds an additional sentence to the original text: "Women shall have equal rights in the United States and every place subject to its jurisdiction."

Proposed removal of ratification deadline 
On March 8, 2011, the 100th anniversary of International Women's Day, Representative Tammy Baldwin (D-Wisconsin) introduced legislation (H.J. Res. 47) to remove the congressionally imposed deadline for ratification of the Equal Rights Amendment. The resolution had 56 cosponsors. The resolution was referred to the Subcommittee on the Constitution by the House Committee on the Judiciary. The Subcommittee failed to vote on the resolution, and as such, the resolution died in subcommittee when the 112th Congress ended in January 2013. On March 22, 2012, the 40th anniversary of the ERA's congressional approval, Senator Benjamin L. Cardin (D-Maryland) introduced (S.J. Res. 39)—which is worded with slight differences from Representative Baldwin's (H.J. Res. 47). Senator Cardin was joined by seventeen other senators who cosponsored the Senate Joint Resolution. The resolution was referred to Senate Committee on the Judiciary, where a vote on it was never brought. The resolution, therefore, died in committee when the 112th Congress ended in January 2013.

On February 24, 2013, the New Mexico House of Representatives adopted House Memorial No. 7 asking that the congressionally imposed deadline for ERA ratification be removed. House Memorial No. 7 was officially received by the U.S. Senate on January 6, 2014, was designated as "POM-175", was referred to the Senate's Committee on the Judiciary.

On January 30, 2019, Representative Jackie Speier (D-California) introduced legislation in a renewed attempt to remove the deadline to ratify the amendment. As of April 30, 2019, the resolution had 188 co-sponsors, including Republicans Tom Reed of New York and Brian Fitzpatrick of Pennsylvania. It was referred to the Subcommittee on the Constitution, Civil Rights, and Civil Liberties by the House Committee on the Judiciary on the same day. The subcommittee heard testimony on the amendment and extension of the deadline on April 30, 2019.

The House passed H.J. Res. 79 on February 13, 2020, by a vote of 232–183, which was mostly along party lines though five Republicans joined in support. The bill expired without Senate action.

At the beginning of the 117th Congress, a joint resolution (H.J.Res. 17) to remove the deadline for ratification was again introduced in both chambers, with bipartisan support. The House passed the resolution by a 222–204 vote on March 17, 2021. The companion bill, S.J.Res. 1, introduced by Senator Ben Cardin, was co-sponsored by all 50 members of the Senate Democratic Caucus and Republicans Lisa Murkowski and Susan Collins. The measure failed as the Senate took no action on it.

State equal rights amendments 

Twenty-five states have adopted constitutions or constitutional amendments providing that equal rights under the law shall not be denied because of sex. Most of these provisions mirror the broad language of the ERA, while the wording in others resembles the Equal Protection Clause of the Fourteenth Amendment. The 1879 Constitution of California contains the earliest state equal rights provision on record. Narrowly written, it limits the equal rights conferred to "entering or pursuing a business, profession, vocation, or employment". Near the end of the 19th century two more states, Wyoming (1890) and Utah (1896), included equal rights provisions in their constitutions. These provisions were broadly written to ensure political and civil equality between women and men. Several states crafted and adopted their own equal rights amendments during the 1970s and 1980s, while the ERA was before the states, or afterward.

Some equal rights amendments and original constitutional equal rights provisions are:

International comparison 

The Southern Legal Council found clauses officially declaring equal rights / non-discrimination on the basis of sex in the constitutions of 168 countries.

See also 
 A Group of Women
 Convention on the Elimination of All Forms of Discrimination Against Women
 Equality Act (United States)
 Equal pay for equal work
 Feminism in the United States
 First-wave feminism
 Grassroots Group of Second Class Citizens
 History of feminism
 History of women in the United States
 Religious Committee for the ERA

Notes

References

Further reading 

 
 
 
 
 
 
  online

External links 

 Alice Paul Institute
 
 

1923 in American law
1923 in American politics
1923 documents
Alice Paul
History of women's rights in the United States
Second-wave feminism
Unratified amendments to the United States Constitution
 
United States proposed federal civil rights legislation